K'un-lun po (also called Kun-lun po, Kunlun po, or K'un-lun bo) were ancient sailing ships used by Austronesian sailors from Maritime Southeast Asia, described by Chinese records from the Han Dynasty. In the first millennium AD, these ships connected trade routes between India and China. Ships of this type were still in use until at least the 14th century.

History 
Greek astronomer, Ptolemy, said in his work Geography (ca. 150 AD) that huge ships came from the east of India. This was also confirmed by an anonymous work called Periplus Marae Erythraensis. Both mention a type of ship called kolandiaphonta (also known as kolandia, kolandiapha, and kolandiapha onta), which is a straightforward transcription of the Chinese word K'un-lun po—meaning "ships of Kun-lun", the Chinese name for Sumatra and/or Java.

The 3rd century book Strange Things of the South (南州異物志 — Nánzhōu Yìwùzhì) by Wan Chen (萬震) describes ships capable of carrying 600–700 people together with more than 10,000 hu (斛) of cargo (250–1000 tons according to various interpretations—600 tons deadweight according to Manguin). These ships came from K'un-lun. The ships are called K'un-lun po (or K'un-lun bo), could be more than 50 meters in length and had a freeboard of 5.2–7.8 meters. When seen from above they resemble covered galleries. Wan Chen explains the ships' sail design as follows:

A 260 CE book by K'ang T'ai (康泰), quoted in Taiping Yulan (982 AD) described ships with seven sails called po or ta po (great ship or great junk) that could travel as far as Syria (大秦—Ta-chin, Roman Syria). These ships were used by the Indo-Scythian (月支—Yuezhi) traders for transporting horses. He also made reference to monsoon trade between the islands (or archipelago), which took a month and a few days in a large po. The word "po" might be derived from the Old Javanese parahu, Javanese word prau, or the Malay word perahu, which means large ship. Note that in modern usage, perahu refers to a small boat.

Faxian (Fa-Hsien) in his return journey to China from India (413–414) embarked a ship carrying 200 passengers and sailors from K'un-lun which towed a smaller ship. A cyclone struck and forced the passengers to move into the smaller ship. The crew of the smaller ship feared that the ship would be overloaded, therefore they cut the rope and separated from the big ship. Luckily the bigger ship survived,  the passengers were stranded in Ye-po-ti (Yawadwipa—Java). After 5 months, the crew and the passengers embarked on another ship comparable in size to sail back to China. In I-ch'ieh-ching yin-i, a dictionary compiled by Huei-lin ca. 817 AD, po is mentioned several times:

Ssu-ma Piao, in his commentary on Chuang Tzü, said that large ocean-going ships are called "po". According to the Kuang Ya, po is an ocean-going ship. It has a draught of 60 feet (18 m). It is fast and carries 1000 men as well as merchandise. It is also called k'un-lun-po. Many of those who form the crews and technicians of these ships are kunlun people.

With the fibrous bark of the coconut tree, they make cords which bind the parts of the ship together (...). Nails and clamps are not used, for fear that the heating of the iron would give rise to fires. The ships are constructed by assembling several thicknesses of side planks, for the boards are thin and that they fear they would break. Their length is over 60 meters (...). Sails are hoisted to make use of the winds, and these ships cannot be propelled by the strength of the men alone.Kuang Ya was a dictionary compiled by Chang I about 230 AD, while Ssu-ma Piao lived from ca. 240 to ca. 305 AD.

Champa was assaulted by Javanese or Kunlun vessels in 774 and 787. In 774 an assault was launched on Po-Nagar in Nha-trang where the pirates demolished temples, while in 787 an assault was launched on Phang-rang. Several Champa coastal cities suffered naval raids and assault from Java. Java armadas was called as Javabala-sanghair-nāvāgataiḥ (fleets from Java) which are recorded in Champa epigraphs.

In 1178, the Guangzhou customs officer Zhou Qufei, wrote in Lingwai Daida about the ships of the Southern country:

The ships which sail the southern sea and south of it are like giant houses. When their sails are spread they are like great clouds in the sky. Their rudders are several tens of feet long. A single ship carries several hundred men, and has in the stores a year's supply of grain. Pigs are fed and wine fermented on board. There is no account of dead or living, no going back to the mainland when once the people have set forth upon the cerulean sea. At daybreak, when the gong sounds aboard the ship, the animals can drink their fill, and crew and passengers alike forget all dangers. To those on board everything is hidden and lost in space, mountains, landmarks, and the countries of foreigners. The shipmaster may say "To make such and such a country, with a favourable wind, in so many days, we should sight such and such a mountain, (then) the ship must steer in such and such a direction". But suddenly the wind may fall, and may not be strong enough to allow of the sighting of the mountain on the given day; in such a case, bearings may have to be changed. And the ship (on the other hand) may be carried far beyond (the landmark) and may lose its bearings. A gale may spring up, the ship may be blown hither and thither, it may meet with shoals or be driven upon hidden rocks, then it may be broken to the very roofs (of its deckhouses). A great ship with heavy cargo has nothing to fear from the high seas, but rather in shallow water it will come to grief.Wang Dayuan's 1349 composition Daoyi Zhilüe Guangzheng Xia ("Description of the Barbarian of the Isles") described the so-called "horse boats" at a place called Gan-mai-li in Southeast Asia. These ships were bigger than normal trading ships, with the sides constructed from multiple planks. The ships uses neither nails or mortar to join them, instead they are using coconut fibre. The ships has two or three decks, with deckhouse over the upper deck. In the lower hold they carried pressed-down frankincense, above them they are carrying several hundred horses. Wang made special mention of these ships because pepper, which is also transported by them, carried to faraway places with large quantity. The normal trading ships carried less than 1/10 of their cargo.

Controversy 
Indian historians usually call this ship as colandia, which they attribute to the Early Chola navy. Periplus Marae Erythraensis mentioned two varieties of vessels. The first kind, known as the Sangara, includes vessels both large and small. The second variety, called kolandiaphonta, was very large in size and these types of vessels were used for voyages to the Ganges and the Chryse, which was the name of various places occurring in ancient Greek geography. The Indians believe Chola had voyages from the ancient port Puhar to Pacific Islands.

It is now generally accepted that kolandiaphonta was a transcription of the Chinese term Kun-lun po, which refers to an Indonesian vessel. The Sangara is likely to have been derived from Indonesian twin-hulled vessels similar to Pacific catamarans.

See also 

 Borobudur ship
 Junk (ship)
 Jong (ship)
 Kunlun Nu

Notes

References

External links
 Ancient history of India

Four-masted ships
Five-masted ships
Six-masted ships
Seven-masted ships
11th-century ships
14th-century ships
Indonesian inventions
Sailboat types
Ship types
Ships of Indonesia
Merchant ships
Austronesian ships
History of Indonesia
Maritime history of Indonesia